Gavin & Stacey is a British romantic situation comedy that follows the long-distance relationship of Gavin (Mathew Horne) from Billericay in Essex, England, and Stacey (Joanna Page) from Barry in the Vale of Glamorgan, Wales. The writers of the show, actors James Corden and Ruth Jones, also co-star as Gavin and Stacey's friends, Smithy and Nessa. Other prominent cast members include Alison Steadman and Larry Lamb, who play Gavin's parents, Pam and Mick, and Melanie Walters and Rob Brydon, who portray Stacey's mother, Gwen, and her uncle, Bryn.

The show was produced by Baby Cow Productions for BBC Wales. It ran for a total of 21 episodes, broadcast from 13 May 2007 to 25 December 2019, comprising three series and two Christmas specials. Initially, the series was shown on channel BBC Three, but a growing following meant that it was subsequently moved to BBC One. The last episodes of the final series formed a significant part of the prime time BBC seasonal programming, and were broadcast on Christmas Day 2009 and New Year's Day 2010. In May 2019, it was confirmed that a new episode was to be created for Christmas Day 2019 and written by James Corden and Ruth Jones.

Series overview

Episodes

Series 1 (2007)

Series 2 (2008)

Special (2008)

Series 3 (2009–10)

Special (2019)

Ratings

Other media

Outtakes special

References

External links
 
 Gavin & Stacey at BBC

Lists of British sitcom episodes
Gavin & Stacey